Gustaf Ferdinand Boberg (11 April 1860 – 7 May 1946) was a Swedish architect.

Biography
Boberg was born in Falun.  He became one of the most productive and prominent architects of Stockholm around the turn of the 20th century. Among his most famous work is an electrical plant at Björns Trädgård in Stockholm, that was inspired by Middle Eastern architecture. The building was converted in the late nineties and is now the Stockholm Mosque. He also designed Nordiska Kompaniet, the most prominent department store in Stockholm and Rosenbad which today houses the Swedish government chancellery.

After retiring as an architect in 1915, Boberg and his wife Anna traveled around Sweden with the aim of preserving the cultural heritage through a book of drawings. Over 3,000 sketches were made and around 1,000 drawings were published in the volume Svenska bilder (“Swedish Images”).

Boberg died in Stockholm, aged 86.

Famous works  
(In chronological order)

 , Stockholm (1883–1884)
 , Hallsberg (1887–1889)
 , Gävle (1890–1891)
 , Stockholm (1892)
 , Saltsjöbaden (1893)
 , (gas holder and main building), Hjorthagen, Stockholm (1893)
 , Stocksund, Stockholm (1896)
 , Djursholm (1896), built for the artist Robert Thegerström
  (1896–97)
 Central post office, Stockholm (1898–1903)
 , Norra Bantorget, Stockholm (1899)
 , Stockholm (1899)
 
  (1900–1906)
 , Stockholm (1902–1906)
 Katarina power station, Stockholm (1903), now Stockholm Mosque, inaugurated in 2000
 , (turbine halls and offices), Hjorthagen, Stockholm (1903)
 Swedish Pavilion at the 1904 St. Louis World's Fair, later moved to Lindsborg, Kansas 
 , Djurgården, Stockholm (1905)
 Thiel Gallery, Djurgården, Stockholm (1905), home of the banker Ernest Thiel, now art museum
 Waldemarsudde, Djurgården (1905–1913), built for Prince Eugen who was also an artist, now museum
 , built for the Industrial Fair in Norrköping 1906, moved to Nyköping 1907
 , Stockholm (1906–1910)
 , Stockholm (1906–1911)
 , Trosa (1907)
 , Djurgården (1910)
  (1913)
 , Varaslätten (1914)
 Margareta Pavilion at the 1914 Baltic Exhibition in Malmö
 Nordiska Kompaniet, NK department store, Stockholm (1915)
 , his own home on Djurgården 1903 to 1925

References

External link

 

1860 births
1946 deaths
Swedish architects
Swedish designers
Swedish printmakers
People from Falun
Burials at Norra begravningsplatsen
Members of the Royal Swedish Academy of Arts